Kai Opae is a rocky peninsula located on the island of Hawai'i. The formation was at one point called "Shrimp Water" in reference to a battle fought on the peninsula between Lonoikamakahiki and Kanaloanuiokeakawaiea warriors. There are no references as to why the battle took place.

References 

Peninsulas of Hawaii